Another Fine Mess is the third studio album by Back Door, released in 1975 by Warner Bros. Records. "Blakey Jones" is a tribute to Brian Jones, landlord of the Lion Inn on Blakey Ridge, an early supporter of the band who helped finance the recording of their first album. A display case of Back Door memorabilia still exists in the Lion Inn.

In 2014 it was re-released on CD, compiled with Back Door and 8th Street Nites, by BGO Records.

Track listing

Personnel
Adapted from the Another Fine Mess liner notes.

Back Door
 Ron Aspery – alto saxophone, soprano saxophone, Wurlitzer electric piano, arrangements
 Tony Hicks – drums, percussion
 Colin Hodgkinson – bass guitar, twelve-string guitar, lead vocals, arrangements

Production and additional personnel
 Rick Dodd – recording
 Michael Gibbs – arrangement (A5)
 Bernie Holland – guitar (B1, B2)
 Dave MacRae – keyboards, accordion
 Peter Thorup – production, mixing, backing vocals (A1, B3), lead vocals (B4)
 Steve Tyler – recording, mixing

Release history

References

External links 
 

1975 albums
Back Door (jazz trio) albums
Warner Records albums